The Atlantic 85 is part of the B-class of lifeboats that serve the shores of the United Kingdom and Ireland as a part of the RNLI inshore fleet.

The Atlantic design of the B-class of lifeboats is named after Atlantic College, where the design was originally developed.

Design
The hull is constructed in a fibre reinforced composite, consisting of a carbon fibre and foam core laminate with an epoxy glass and foam sandwich layup. The tubes are Hypalon.

The boat is powered by twin  Yamaha 4-stroke outboard engines that have been inversion-proofed to ensure the engines are still operational after a capsize. 

Like previous RIBs, it has a manually operated self-righting mechanism that deploys an airbag mounted atop the A-frame. It is capable of being beached in an emergency without sustaining damage to engines or steering gear. The Atlantic 85 is fitted with radar and VHF direction finding equipment and can be operated safely in daylight in a force 6/7 and at night in a force 5/6.

The Atlantic 85 also has intercom communications between the crew and VHF radio via their helmets, DGPS & Chartplotter. It also carries a searchlight, night-vision equipment and illuminating paraflares for night-time operations.

To ensure equipment is kept to a high standard of repair, boats go through annual or bi-annual overhauls, and 4-year refits.

Fleet

See also 
 Talus MB-4H amphibious tractor
 Talus Atlantic 85 DO-DO launch carriage

References

External links 

 RNLI Fleet
 B-class Atlantic 85